San Rafael, is a ghost town in Pima County, Arizona, United States.

History
On November 24, 1865, San Rafael, then a ranching community, was the site of a raid, by a large Sonoran force of about 350 Opata volunteers under the command of Col. Refugio Tanori, an Opata leader commissioned in the Mexican Imperial Army, that left an American citizen wounded.  It was believed to be an attempt to capture Sonora Governor Ignacio Pesquiera, who had fled the advance of French troops, taking refuge in Arizona Territory.

References

History of Arizona
Pre-statehood history of Arizona
Ghost towns in Arizona
Former populated places in Pima County, Arizona
Tohono O'odham Nation